Sevsky District is an administrative and municipal district (raion), one of the twenty-seven in Bryansk Oblast, Russia. It is located in the southeast of the oblast. Its administrative center is the town of Sevsk. Population:   18,759 (2002 Census);  The population of Sevsk accounts for 47.5% of the district's total population.

References

Notes

Sources

Districts of Bryansk Oblast